Sheila Oates Williams (born 1939, also published as Sheila Oates and Sheila Oates Macdonald) is a British and Australian mathematician specializing in abstract algebra. She is the namesake of the Oates–Powell theorem in group theory, and a winner of the B. H. Neumann Award.

Education and career
Sheila Oates was originally from Cornwall, where her father was a primary school headmaster in Tintagel. She was educated at Sir James Smith's Grammar School, and inspired to become a mathematician by a teacher there, Alfred Hooper. She read mathematics in St Hugh's College, Oxford, with Ida Busbridge as her tutor, and continued at Oxford as a doctoral student of Graham Higman. She completed her doctorate (D.Phil.) in 1963.

She became a lecturer and fellow at St Hilda's College, Oxford, before moving to Australia in 1965. In 1966, she took a position as senior lecturer at the University of Newcastle and later moved again to the University of Queensland, as reader. She retired in 1997.

Contributions
As a student at Oxford, with Martin B. Powell, another student of Higman, she proved the Oates–Powell theorem. This is an analogue for group theory of Hilbert's basis theorem, and states that all finite groups have a finite system of axioms from which can be derived all equations that are true of the group. That is, every finite group is finitely based.

As well as for her research, Williams is known for her work setting Australian mathematics competitions, including the International Mathematical Olympiad in 1988 and the Australian Mathematics Competition. She also participated several times in the Australian edition of the Mastermind television quiz show.

Recognition
Williams was a 2002 recipient of the B. H. Neumann Award for Excellence in Mathematics Enrichment of the Australian Maths Trust.

References

1939 births
Living people
Australian mathematicians
Australian women mathematicians
British mathematicians
British women mathematicians
Alumni of St Hugh's College, Oxford
Fellows of St Hilda's College, Oxford
Academic staff of the University of Newcastle (Australia)
Academic staff of the University of Queensland
People from Tintagel